National Democratic Party is right wing political party in Bangladesh. Salahuddin Kader Chowdhury was elected member of 5th parliament of Bangladesh. Khandaker Golam Mortuza was the chairman till 2018 of the National Democratic Party. Now K M Abu Taher is the Chairman and Abdullah-Al-Harun (Sohel) is Secretary General of the National Democratic Party (NDP).

History
Salahuddin Quader Chowdhury led the National Democratic Party in the early 1990s and worked against the Bangladesh Awami League against the Bangladesh Nationalist Party government.

The National Democratic Party joined the National Democratic Front, an alliance of 10 nationalist party, in September 2014. The Party had quit the Bangladesh Nationalist Party led Grand Alliance in October 2014. Salahuddin Quader Chowdhury was elected to Parliament on a National Democratic Party nomination from Chittagong-6 in 1991.

National Democratic Party left the Bangladesh Nationalist Party (BNP) in 2022 and create a 12 party alliance.

References

 
Nationalist parties in Asia
Political parties in Bangladesh
Organisations based in Dhaka